D.A.V. College (Lahore), Ambala City is a college in Ambala, Haryana, India. It was started in 1886 in Lahore, Punjab Province (British India). After partition it moved to present campus of Ambala in 1948. It is affiliated to Kurukshetra University, Kurukshetra.

Notable alumni
I. K. Gujral
Har Gobind Khurana
Krishan Kant
R N Mittal
Chetan Sharma
Jagmohan Singh Kang
Resham Singh Anmol
Sahabji Maharaj

References

External links
 

Universities and colleges affiliated with the Arya Samaj
Educational institutions established in 1886
1886 establishments in India